Jamonda Roshawn Bryant Jr. (born March 5, 2000) is an American college basketball player for the Norfolk State Spartans of the Mid-Eastern Athletic Conference (MEAC).

High school career
Bryant attended Lake Taylor High School in Norfolk, Virginia, where one of his teammates was Dereon Seabron. Bryant was a two-time First Team All-Tidewater pick who led Lake Taylor to a state title as a senior. He committed to play college basketball at Norfolk State.

College career
Bryant finished second on the team in scoring during his sophomore year with 12.0 points per game while also tallying 3.8 rebounds, 2.1 assists and 1.8 steals per game. He averaged 11.1 points and 4.2 rebounds per game as a junior. As a senior at Norfolk State, Bryant averaged 16.7 points, 5.1 rebounds and 3.2 assists per game. He shot 91.5 percent from the foul line, setting the Norfolk State record. Bryant was named Mid-Eastern Athletic Conference Player of the Year as well as conference tournament MVP. Following the season, he decided to return for his additional season of eligibility.

Personal life
Bryant's mother Helen Holloway played basketball at Penn State. She was named Atlantic 10 Freshman of the Year and helped lead the Nittany Lions to four straight NCAA Tournaments. Bryant has a younger sister, Jada.

References

External links
Norfolk State Spartans bio

2000 births
Living people
American men's basketball players
Basketball players from Norfolk, Virginia
Norfolk State Spartans men's basketball players
Point guards